Chris Taylor is an American singer and songwriter, based in San Antonio, Texas. He is the lead singer of Love Coma and a solo performer.

Taylor won the grand prize in a Dove soap jingle contest in 1997 with a song he called Lather Up which was written to the Rolling Stones tune Start Me Up. Taylor's 2000 album, Worthless Pursuit of Things on the Earth, was nominated as Rock Album of the Year for the 2001 Dove Awards.

Discography
 1997: Good Thing single (Rhythm House)
 1998: Down Goes the Day (Rhythm House)
 2000: Worthless Pursuit of Things on the Earth  (Rhythm House)
 2001: The Lo-Fi Project (independent)
 2001: Brand New Ache (independent)
 2004: Under the Sun (independent)
 2006: Acoustic Collection Vol. 1 (independent)
 2008: Rock and Roll Heart (independent)
 2010: Twilight Sunrise (independent)
 2010: Music is the Engine (independent)
 2006: Acoustic Collection Vol. 2 (independent)
 2011: Everything Begins Here (independent)
 2011: Songs Along the Way compilation
 2011: blue 
 2011: Enter The Story (Christmas EP) 
 2012: Frame the Light
 2013: Stranger's Clothes
 2013: Travellers Hotel
 2013: Postcards From the End of Time
 2014: Daylight
 2016: Never Ending Now
 2019: Lovers Thieves Fools Pretenders

Chris Taylor and Dave Stewart (formerly of the Eurhythmics, worked with Mick Jaggar, Bono, Sinéad O'Connor, etc.) have co-written a song called "Here and Gone (But Everlasting)".

See also
 Love Coma

References

External links
 
 The Phantom Tollbooth: Chris Taylor interview (2002)

Living people
Year of birth missing (living people)
American rock songwriters
American rock singers
Musicians from San Antonio
Singer-songwriters from Texas